Queen Moremi: The Musical is a 2019 Nigerian musical about 12th-century queen Moremi Ajasoro. The show was produced by Bolanle Austern-Peters Productions and the House of Oduduwa. It was directed by Bolanle Austen-Peters and produced by Joseph Umoibum. The show's music was composed by Kehinde Oritinehin.

Productions 
The idea for the musical came about in December 2017. Princess Ronke Ademiluyi approached Austern-Peters to direct the musical.

Paolo Sisiano and Justin Ezirin helped choreograph the show. House of Emisara provided jewelry for the production.

The shown ran from December 21, 2018, to January 2, 2019, at Terrakulture theatre, Victoria Island.

In April 2019 a reloaded version of the show returned to Lagos for a limited run from 18 April 2019 until 5 May 2019. The show had a third run that December, from 24 December 2019 until 2 January 2020.

Synopsis 
The stage drama is about Moremi, the historic woman who saved the people of Ile-Ife from those who sought to enslave them.

Cast

References

Further reading 
 

Works about Nigeria
2018 musicals
2019 musicals